Nine Mile is a rural locality in the Rockhampton Region, Queensland, Australia.

History 
Nine Mine Provisional School opened on 8 July 1901 as a half-time school in conjunction with Lavendale Provisional School, sharing one teacher between them. In 1908, Woodville Provisional School opened and the teacher was shared between all three schools. In 1909 Nine Mile Provisional School closed due to low student numbers.

Paradise Lagoons Campdraft 
An annual campdrafting event called the Paradise Lagoons Campdraft is held in Nine Mile each year. A multi-million dollar, purpose-built facility was opened in 2003 when the event was inaugurated by Graeme Acton who died following a campdrafting accident at Clarke Creek in 2014. Acton's funeral was held at Paradise Lagoons in Nine Mile which was attended by numerous dignitaries including then-Prime Minister Tony Abbott, who had attended the campdraft the previous year prior to becoming prime minister.

References 

Suburbs of Rockhampton Region
Localities in Queensland